Jesse Ellis Lingard (born 15 December 1992) is an English professional footballer who plays as an attacking midfielder or winger for  club Nottingham Forest and the England national team. He has won the UEFA Europa League, FA Cup, FA Community Shield, and EFL Cup, becoming one of only three players to score in all of the latter three finals.

Lingard made his senior debut while on loan at Leicester City in 2012, and spent time on loan at Birmingham City and Brighton & Hove Albion during the 2013–14 season and at Derby County in 2015. He broke into the Manchester United first-team under Louis van Gaal in 2015, and was a regular in the side until 2019, when he fell out of favour under Ole Gunnar Solskjær and struggled to regain his place in the team. A productive loan spell with West Ham United in 2021 saw Lingard rediscover his form, scoring nine goals in 16 appearances. He returned to Manchester United for one more year until he was released at the end of the 2021–22 season.

He represented England at under-17 and under-21 levels, before making his senior international debut in October 2016 and representing his country at the 2018 FIFA World Cup, where England finished fourth.

Early life
Lingard was born in Warrington, Cheshire, and attended William Beamont Community High School.

Club career

Manchester United

Youth career
Having played for Fletcher Moss Rangers and Penketh United as a youngster, Lingard joined Manchester United's youth academy at the age of seven and progressed through the age groups. He was part of the Manchester United team that won the 2010–11 FA Youth Cup, before signing a professional contract in the summer of 2011.

2011–12 season
Lingard was first included in a senior matchday squad on 30 November 2011, in the League Cup quarter-finals against Crystal Palace at Old Trafford, remaining unused as Sir Alex Ferguson's team lost 2–1 after extra time. He had his only other call-up of the season on 4 January 2012, again unused in a 3–0 away Premier League loss to Newcastle United.

2012–13 season: Loan to Leicester City

On 6 November 2012, Lingard and teammate Michael Keane joined Leicester City on loan for a month. He made his competitive debut later that day, in a 0–0 Championship draw away to Bolton Wanderers, coming on as a substitute for Martyn Waghorn in the 85th minute. His loan was later extended to 2 January 2013, and he totalled five appearances for the Foxes.

2013–14 season
Lingard was selected in the 19-man squad for Manchester United's 2013 pre-season tour. He scored his first two goals for United in a 5–1 friendly win against the A-League All Stars in Sydney on 20 July, the first of which was the club's first goal under new manager David Moyes. After the match, he said "I believe in myself but I have to start believing in myself more". He also scored against Yokohama F. Marinos and Kitchee SC to finish the tour as top scorer with four goals in as many matches.

Although he had hoped to "skip the loan stage this time and break straight through" at Manchester United, Lingard joined Birmingham City on a month's loan on 19 September, and went straight into the starting eleven for the Championship match against Sheffield Wednesday at St Andrew's two days later. He opened the scoring after 20 minutes with his first goal in senior football when goalkeeper Chris Kirkland parried Chris Burke's shot, completed his hat-trick 13 minutes later, and scored a fourth in the second half to secure a 4–1 win. Lingard was unavailable for Birmingham's League Cup third-round tie because Manchester United did not want him cup-tied, then in his third league match, he made up for missing a penalty, awarded when he was fouled apparently outside the area, with an 89th-minute header to complete a 4–0 defeat of Millwall. Agreement was reached to extend Lingard's loan until 14 December, but he then missed three matches while receiving treatment at Manchester United for a knee injury. The loan was further extended, to 1 January 2014, but Lingard was suspended for the last two matches of the spell. He was sent off during a match against Wigan Athletic on 26 December for a lunge on Jordi Gómez immediately after being refused a free kick when he appeared to be fouled.

Although Birmingham hoped to extend the loan, Lingard returned to Manchester United and was an unused substitute in the match against Swansea City on 11 January.

On 27 February 2014, Lingard joined another Championship club, Brighton & Hove Albion, on a 93-day loan. He scored his first goal for the club on 8 April, in a 4–1 win against former club Leicester City, who had sealed promotion to the Premier League days earlier. While with Albion, Lingard played 17 times, including in the Championship play-offs, and scored 4 goals.

2014–15 season
On 4 August 2014, Lingard came off the bench to score the third goal in United's 3–1 International Champions Cup Final win over Liverpool. He made his competitive debut for the club in the first match of the 2014–15 Premier League season at home to Swansea City, starting the match but was replaced by Adnan Januzaj because of injury after 24 minutes. Swansea won 2–1 in Louis van Gaal's first competitive match as United manager.

On 2 February 2015, Lingard joined Championship club Derby County on loan until the end of the season. He made his first start on 14 February, against Reading in the FA Cup.

2015–16 season

On 7 November 2015, Lingard scored his first senior goal for Manchester United in a 2–0 win against West Bromwich Albion at Old Trafford, opening the scoring with a shot past Boaz Myhill from outside the penalty area. On 12 January 2016, he scored against Newcastle United in a 3–3 draw at St James' Park, with a finish that went between the legs of the goalkeeper after a reverse assist from Wayne Rooney. He added his third goal of the season on 2 February against Stoke City in a 3–0 victory with a closer range diving header from a cross by Cameron Borthwick-Jackson. On 7 February 2016, Lingard scored his fourth goal of the season in a 1–1 draw against Chelsea at Stamford Bridge, breaking the deadlock with a spin and shot inside the penalty area. On 21 May 2016, Lingard scored the winning goal for Manchester United in the 2016 FA Cup Final against Crystal Palace, having come on as a second-half substitute for other goalscorer Juan Mata.

2016–17 season
Lingard scored the opening goal as Manchester United beat Premier League champions Leicester City 2–1 to win the 2016 FA Community Shield. He scored another important goal in February 2017, this time United's second of a 3–2 win over Southampton in the 2017 EFL Cup Final. On 6 April 2017, Lingard signed a new contract with Manchester United, of four years with an option for a fifth.

2018–19 season
On 5 December 2018, Jesse Lingard scored his first domestic goal of the season in a 2–2 draw against Arsenal. Two weeks later, in the North West derby, Lingard scored his second of the season in a 3–1 loss to Liverpool. During United's first game under new interim manager Ole Gunnar Solskjær, Lingard doubled his season's tally, scoring a penalty and a goal from open play in United's 5–1 win over Cardiff City, in addition to an assist for Anthony Martial. On 25 January 2019, Lingard scored the second goal in a 3–1 win over Arsenal in the fourth round of the FA Cup.

2019–20 season
On 26 July 2020, Lingard scored his first goal in the final matchday of Premier League; his first since December 2018 in the 98th minute to seal a 2–0 win at Leicester City. His goal secured qualification for the 2020–21 UEFA Champions League and was the final goal of the 2019–20 Premier League campaign.

2020–21 season: Loan to West Ham United

On 29 January 2021, Lingard joined West Ham United on loan until the end of the season, where he reunited with former Manchester United boss David Moyes. On his debut on 3 February 2021, Lingard scored two goals against Aston Villa as West Ham won 3–1.

In a match against Wolves on 5 April, Lingard carried the ball 52 metres before firing past Rui Patrício, the furthest a player had travelled with the ball before scoring in the Premier League during the season. Lingard continued his good form during his loan spell, contributing nine goals and four assists in his first 10 Premier League games for West Ham. His ninth goal was scored from the penalty spot in the club's 2–3 defeat at Newcastle United on 17 April. The goal meant he had scored more Premier League goals for West Ham than he ever managed in a single season at Manchester United.

For his goal performances in April and for his goal against Wolves, Lingard won both the Premier League Player of the Month and the Premier League Goal of the Month. He played 16 games during his loan spell, scoring nine and assisting five goals.

2021–22 season
On 11 September 2021, Lingard scored the fourth goal for Manchester United in a 4–1 win over Newcastle. On 19 September, Lingard scored an 89th minute winner in 2–1 defeat of West Ham.

On 1 June 2022, Manchester United announced that Lingard would leave the club following the expiration of his contract.

Nottingham Forest
On 21 July 2022, Lingard signed for newly promoted Premier League club Nottingham Forest on a one-year contract.

International career

Youth
Lingard played three times for England at under-17 level in the 2008 Nordic Tournament. He received his first call-up for the under-21 team for the friendly match against Scotland under-21s on 13 August 2013, and made his debut as a second-half substitute for Nathan Redmond as England won 6–0. On 21 June 2015, Lingard came off the bench to score the winner in a 2015 UEFA European Under-21 Championship group match against Sweden.

Senior

After Michael Carrick and Jamie Vardy withdrew through injury, Lingard received his first call-up to the full England squad, for a friendly against France on 17 November 2015. He did not appear in the match.

Lingard received his next call-up for World Cup qualifiers against Malta and Slovenia in October 2016. He made his debut against Malta, starting on the left wing as England won 2–0. Lingard scored his first goal on 23 March 2018, in a 1–0 win over the Netherlands in a friendly.

In May 2018, Lingard was named in the 23-man England squad for the 2018 FIFA World Cup. On 24 June, Lingard scored his first ever World Cup goal in a 6–1 victory over Panama during their second group stage match. During the tournament, Lingard received five starts, plus a substitute appearance in the third place play off against Belgium which saw England finish fourth in the tournament.

During the November international break, Lingard scored the first goal in Wayne Rooney's farewell match against the USA on 15 November. On the following Sunday, Lingard scored the equaliser in 2–1 win over Croatia which put England top of their group and qualified them for the UEFA Nations League semi-finals to be held in June 2019.

He was left out of the England squad for Euro 2020 qualifying matches in October 2019. His performances while on loan with West Ham United, since January 2021, earned Lingard a recall to the England squad in March 2021. In May 2021 he was named in the provisional England squad for Euro 2020, but later omitted from the final squad and named as a stand-by player for the finals.

Personal life
Lingard was born in England, and his paternal grandparents are emigrants from Saint Vincent and the Grenadines. Lingard is a cousin of Everton and England women's international footballer Gabby George.

His parents separated when Lingard was very young, and his grandfather would take him to training and was his biggest supporter. He lived partially with his grandparents and also with his mother, as she suffered with depression, and struggled to get out of bed. Due to his mother suffering from mental health issues, Lingard needed to care for his younger siblings, Jasper, and Daisy-Boo.

Lingard has a daughter named Hope, whom he co-parents with fitness model former girlfriend Rebecca Halliday.

Media
Two of Lingard's goal celebrations are featured in the EA Sports' FIFA video game series. His imaginary flute playing celebration appears in FIFA 18, and the 'Milly Rock' dance celebration features in FIFA 19.

Business ventures
In 2018, Lingard launched his own clothing brand, JLingz. The company was criticised by Manchester United former players Roy Keane and Gary Neville as being a distraction from football. It recorded losses of over £200,000 in its first year of trading.

Career statistics

Club

International

England score listed first, score column indicates score after each Lingard goal

Honours
Manchester United Academy
FA Youth Cup: 2010–11

Manchester United
FA Cup: 2015–16
EFL Cup: 2016–17
FA Community Shield: 2016
UEFA Europa League: 2016–17

England
UEFA Nations League third place: 2018–19

Individual
Premier League Player of the Month: April 2021
Premier League Goal of the Month: April 2021

References

External links

Profile at the Football Association website

1992 births
Living people
Footballers from Warrington
English footballers
Association football midfielders
Association football wingers
Fletcher Moss Rangers F.C. players
Manchester United F.C. players
Leicester City F.C. players
Birmingham City F.C. players
Brighton & Hove Albion F.C. players
Derby County F.C. players
West Ham United F.C. players
Nottingham Forest F.C. players
English Football League players
Premier League players
FA Cup Final players
UEFA Europa League winning players
England youth international footballers
England under-21 international footballers
England international footballers
2018 FIFA World Cup players
Black British sportsmen
English people of Saint Vincent and the Grenadines descent